We Reserve the Right is the debut album by American glam metal band Madam X, released in 1984.

Track listing

Personnel
Madam X
Bret Kaiser - vocals
Maxine Petrucci - guitars, backing vocals
Chris "Godzilla" Doliber - bass, backing vocals
Roxy Petrucci - drums, backing vocals

Production
Rick Derringer - producer
George Tutko - engineer

1984 debut albums
Jet Records albums